Malathi is a 1970 Indian Tamil-language drama film written, produced and directed by K. S. Gopalakrishnan. The film stars Gemini Ganesan, B. Saroja Devi and Ravichandran.

Plot 

Malathi, a young woman from a wealthy family, pursues MBBS in a medical college, where she meets Balu, a senior student. They fall in love, but due to her family circumstances, they are unable to marry; Malathi ends up marrying Rajan, a relative, who is addicted to drinking and drugs. She decides to reform him, and the rest of the film deals with whether she succeeds in her endeavour or not.

Cast 
Gemini Ganesan as Dr. Balu
Ravichandran as Ananth
B. Saroja Devi as Malathi
Major Sundarrajan as Sundaresan
S. Varalakshmi as Gowri
V. Gopalakrishnan as Chandrasekaran
K. Sarangapani as Marthandan
Nagesh as Natraj
Thengai Srinivasan as Vaithuvali Mama
Ushanandini as Chandra
Jayakumari as Devika

Production 
Malathi was produced and directed by K. S. Gopalakrishnan. The screenplay, written by him, was based on a story by Gomathi Subramaniam. Cinematography was handled by K. S. Prasad.

Soundtrack 
The soundtrack was composed by M. S. Viswanathan, who was assisted by Govardhanam and Joseph Krishna. The lyrics were written by Kannadasan, and the playback singers were S. P. Balasubrahmanyam, Sirkazhi Govindarajan, T. M. Soundararajan, L. R. Eswari and P. Susheela.
"Chit Chit" – SPB, P. Susheela
"Karpanaiyo" – SPB, P. Susheela
"Enge En" – T. M. Soundararajan, L. R. Eswari

Release and reception 
The film was moderately successful. Film historian Randor Guy praised the performances of Ganesan, Saroja Devi and Ravichandran, along with Prasad's cinematography.

References

External links 
 

1970 drama films
1970 films
1970s Tamil-language films
Films about alcoholism
Films directed by K. S. Gopalakrishnan
Films scored by M. S. Viswanathan
Films with screenplays by K. S. Gopalakrishnan
Indian drama films